Live Wire or Livewire, in comics, may refer to:

 Live Wire (Marvel Comics), a Marvel Comics supervillain
 Live Wire (DC Comics), an alias of the Legion of Super-Heroes member Garth Ranzz, aka Lightning Lad
 Livewire (DC Comics), a DC Comics supervillainess
 Livewire (Valiant Comics), a Valiant Comics character 
 Livewires (comics), a Marvel Comics series
 Livewire (Image Comics), a character from Savage Dragon and a member of the Vicious Circle (comics)

See also
Livewire (disambiguation)

References